Britain's Favourite Supermarket Foods is a British documentary series which was first broadcast on BBC One on 15 February 2012 as a one-off special. The programme returned on 18 July 2013 and aired for two episodes. Presented by Cherry Healey, the programme investigates some of the UK's favourite supermarket foods, revealing their secrets and unexpected powers.

References

2010s British documentary television series
2012 British television series debuts
2013 British television series endings
Business-related television series in the United Kingdom
English-language television shows